Concressault is a commune in the Cher department in the Centre-Val de Loire region of France.

Geography

Population

History
In the medieval period, Concressault was surrounded by fortifications and therefore had the status of "city". The village developed itself around a castle built some distance aside of the older village of Dampierre-en-Crot. The new village ended up, at some point in the past, being more important than the first one.

The castle
In his manuscript on the Berry, Nicolas de Nicolay gave up a description of the castle as it was in 1567. According to him, he fortress got ruined by the English during the Hundred Years' War (1337–1453). A short time after the destruction it got rebuilt in a more solid form by the Duke Jean de Berry (1340–1416). The castle had an hexagonal shape, with 32 meters high and 12 meters thick walls made of hard rocks. Buildings were built out of colored bricks and covered by slate. The moats were 32 meters large and 4 meters deep.

Sir John Stewart of Darnley, a Scottish nobleman, was awarded the title of "Lord of Concressault" thanks to his participation to the Battle of Baugé. In March 1423, he also becomes the Lord of Aubigny-sur-Nère. Under the reign of Charles VII (1422–1462) the castle was besieged again by the English who were not able to take control of it. Chased by the French, they mistook a narrow pit for the Sauldre river, that they thought they could pass through a ford. Many of them sank and the pit got called "la fosse aux Anglais" (literally: the pit of the English).

Sights
 The church of St. Pierre, dating from the fifteenth century
 The ruins of a fourteenth-century castle, destroyed by the English during the Hundred Years War
 Two old watermills and ancient barns at the Domaine du Moulin au Riche
 A museum, the Musée de la Sorcellerie

See also
Communes of the Cher department

References

External links

Photos of the castle ruins

Communes of Cher (department)